Michel Szulc-Krzyzanowski (born 23 April 1949, in Oosterhout), is a Dutch photographic artist, possibly best known for his series of photographs of a Dutch woman, Henny, whom he has been documenting since the 1970s.

References

External links

 
 Archive of his Fotoboeken Het Henny project at the International Institute of Social History

1949 births
Living people
Dutch photographers
People from Oosterhout